An election official, election officer, election judge, election clerk, or poll worker is an official responsible for the proper and orderly voting at polling stations. Depending on the country or jurisdiction, election officials may be identified as members of a political party or non-partisan. They are generally volunteers or paid a small stipend for their work. Each polling station is staffed with multiple officials. The duties include signing in registered voters, explaining voting procedure and use of voting equipment, providing ballots, and monitoring the conduct of the election.

Election officials in the USA
In US states with Election Day voter registration, they also register unregistered voters on election day. In most other countries, however, voters do not need to register, all citizens being automatically included in the lists of eligible voters.  Depending on the jurisdiction, election officials are chosen by a board of elections, county official (such as the county clerk or county auditor), city or township official (such as a city clerk), the federal state, or a national committee.  

In California, poll workers can be any citizen who requests the job at least two months prior to an election. Inspectors and site supervisors receive a minimum of two training classes, and clerks are required to attend a training class within two weeks of the election, with additional certification classes for any machine or technological devices to be used. These classes cover a wide range of topics, including opening and closing of the polls, which color pen to use on which paper, dealing with irate voters, and the rare times when a voter can be challenged.

In 41 of the 50 United States, high school students can serve as student election judges. Each state has its own set of requirements for students to serve as poll workers, but generally, students must be in good academic standing at their school and meet the particular age or grade conditions.

Voting security
Election officials play a prominent role in voting security as well as cybersecurity. In the 2016 US presidential elections, there were claims that the election was influenced by Russian government operatives through cyber attacks and disinformation. Because of this, election officials have been working alongside the Department of Homeland Security (DHS) to ensure a more secure voting system. However, many election officials are unsure of how DHS would be of help. DHS emerged after the 2000 presidential election to aid state and local election officials after the various problems faced in that election. Now more than ever, election officials play a vital role in all kinds of elections to ensure a more secure and safer place to vote.

Election reform
About 85% of election officials, or LEOs, are very satisfied with their current voting systems. However, many reported areas in which improvement was needed such as accuracy in counting, reliability, security, and ease of use by voters. These days votes are taken by optical scan and direct recording electronics' (DRE), but LEOs have received negative average ratings for not using other systems such as punchcards, lever machines, and hand-counter paper ballots. Many of these older voting systems have been used for 40 years or more in various voting areas. Experienced voters are familiar with these old systems, but they are not as reliable in terms of efficiency as compared to newer systems. The 2000 US presidential election is an example of how continued use of old voting systems can cause various problems. As newer voting systems come along, LEOs will be able to provide the accuracy and reliability that they are looking for.

See also
Returning officer
Scrutineer

External links
Elections Office of Minneapolis, Minnesota - Page describing the duties of an election judge

Elections
County officers in the United States

References